Maurice Edelston (27 April 1918 – 30 January 1976) was an English footballer, who later became a sports commentator. Born in Hull, England, he was son of the Hull City footballer Joe Edelston. At the age of 18, he played in the football tournament in the 1936 Berlin Olympics for Great Britain.

Playing career 
Edelston played league football with Fulham and Brentford (following his father, Joe Edelston, then a coach, to both clubs), non-league football with Wimbledon and Corinthian and in April 1939 he joined Reading (where his father was manager) and played for them successfully as an inside forward until 1952. At international level, he represented Great Britain at the 1936 Summer Olympics, scored seven goals in eight games for England Amateurs and won five wartime caps for England. He finished his playing career at Northampton Town in 1953.

Broadcasting career 
Around the late 1950s he went into broadcasting and was a regular BBC radio commentator by 1960. During the 1960s he also commentated for BBC television and Southern Television. Although most of his commentaries were on football, he also covered tennis, especially Wimbledon.

He was a summariser on England's 1966 FIFA World Cup victory  as well as the FA Cup Final in 1967 and 1968. He commentated on the event from 1969 to 1975. He reached his peak around the late 1960s and early 1970s, when he was broadcasting almost every week, covering European finals and England matches, as well as a number of league title deciders (Arsenal's victory at Tottenham Hotspur in 1971, and Wolves' defeat of Leeds which handed the title to Derby County in 1972). He also co-wrote the books Masters of Soccer and Wickets, Tries and Goals.

By the mid-1970s, his career was somewhat in decline as the emergence of Alan Parry was denying him the chance to commentate on matches such as England vs Scotland in 1975, and the controversial European Cup final in which Bayern Munich beat Leeds United four days later. However, he continued to cover tennis during the summer of 1975 and was still broadcasting regularly when he died suddenly from a heart attack in Tilehurst on 30 January 1976, aged 57.

Legacy 
A library at the Reading Blue Coat School is named after him, as is an award that Reading present to the outstanding schoolboy in their Academy.

References

External links

1918 births
British association football commentators
1976 deaths
Footballers from Kingston upon Hull
English footballers
Footballers at the 1936 Summer Olympics
Olympic footballers of Great Britain
Reading F.C. players
Liverpool F.C. wartime guest players
England wartime international footballers
Arsenal F.C. wartime guest players
Watford F.C. wartime guest players
British radio personalities
British sports broadcasters
England amateur international footballers
English Football League players
Association football inside forwards
Fulham F.C. players
Wimbledon F.C. players
Brentford F.C. players
Northampton Town F.C. players
Isthmian League players
Corinthian F.C. players
Brentford F.C. wartime guest players